The Megaruma is a river of northeastern Mozambique, flowing through Ancuabe District. It has its source to the northeast in Mount Mecumba.
A bridge was built over the river in 1954.

References

Rivers of Mozambique
Cabo Delgado Province